Corton is an unincorporated community in Kanawha County, West Virginia, United States.

The community's name is an amalgamation of the names of two businessmen in the gas industry: J. J. Cornwell and Mr. Tonkin.

References

Unincorporated communities in Kanawha County, West Virginia
Unincorporated communities in West Virginia